Berehanu Wendemu Tsegu (born 30 September 1999) is an Ethiopian long-distance runner. He holds a personal best of 27:00.73 minutes for the 10,000 metres. He was the 
10,000 metres champion at 2019 African Games.

He finished second at the 2018 Corrida de Houilles. In 2019, he also won the Yangzhou Jianzhen International Half Marathon with a time of 59:56, only four seconds slower than the course record at the time.

He tested positive for erythropoietin (EPO), a banned blood booster, at the 2019 Copenhagen Half Marathon. Though he initially disputed the results, he later admitted to the violation and received a four-year ban from the sport. This occurred during a period where World Athletics had highlighted Ethiopia as a country at risk of widespread doping, which was followed by the launch of an education programme by the Ethiopian Athletics Federation.

See also
List of doping cases in athletics

References

External links

1999 births
Living people
Ethiopian male long-distance runners
African Games gold medalists for Ethiopia
African Games gold medalists in athletics (track and field)
African Games medalists in athletics (track and field)
Athletes (track and field) at the 2019 African Games
21st-century Ethiopian people